The Huayan or Flower Garland school of Buddhism (from ) is a tradition of Mahayana Buddhist philosophy that first flourished in China during the Tang dynasty (618-907). The Huayan worldview is based primarily on the Avatamsaka Sutra as well as on the works of the Huayan patriarchs, like Fazang. The name Flower Garland is meant to suggest the crowning glory of a Buddha's profound understanding of ultimate reality.

The Huayan School is known as Hwaeom in Korea, Kegon in Japan and Hoa Nghiêm in Vietnam. This tradition also had a strong influence on Chan Buddhism.

History

Origins
There are various versions of the Avatamsaka sutra. The earliest texts associated with the Avatamsaka sutra are the Dousha jing (Taisho 280), produced by Lokaksema in the latter part of the second century CE and the Pusa benye jing (T. 281), translated by Zhi Qian in the early to mid third century. There is evidence that these smaller or partial Avatamsaka sutras circulated on their own as individual scriptures.

The translation of the large Avatamsaka sutra is often dated to the Southern Dynasties (420-589) when a translation team led by Gandharan master, Buddhabhadra worked on the sutra. There is also evidence of this sutra tradition in the Northern Dynasties (386-581) where a certain  Xuangao (402-444) taught the Huayan samadhi.

Patriarchs

The founding of the school is traditionally attributed to a series of five "patriarchs" who were instrumental in developing the schools' doctrines. These five are:
Dushun, responsible for the establishment of Huayan studies as a distinct field;
Zhiyan, considered to have established the basic doctrines of the sect;
Fazang, considered to have rationalized the doctrine for greater acceptance by society;
Chengguan, together with Zongmi, are understood to have further developed and transformed the teachings
Guifeng Zongmi, who is simultaneous a patriarch of the Chinese Chán tradition and who also incorporated Taoist and Confucian teachings.

These five monks who were later honored as Huayan patriarchs (though they did not call themselves as such) were erudite scholar-practitioners. They connected Buddhism with Chinese traditional culture closely, creating a unique Chinese Buddhist historical trend in developing multiple facets while the tradition’s essence remained the same. 

Based on their writings, exegeses, and oral teachings, these men each played a significant and distinct role in the development of the school, although there are certain aspects of this patriarchal scheme which are clearly contrived. For example, Chengguan was born 26 years after Fazang's death. According to Robert Gimello's dissertation on Chih-Yen (1976), "most if not all of the major themes of Huayen thought" can be found in the works of the second patriarch Chih-yen, particularly the classification of scriptures and theories on the Dharmadhatu. Thus he names the patriarch Chih-yen (602-668) as the crucial figure in the foundation of Huayan. The tradition reached the height of its influence under Fazang, who was the Buddhist teacher of the Empress Wu Zetian (684–705).

Another important figure in the development and popularization of Huayan thought was the lay scholar Li Tongxuan (635?-730), the author of the Huáyán lùn, a popular and lengthy commentary on the Avatamsaka sutra. Fazang's disciple Huiyuan(慧苑) (673-743) also wrote a commentary on the Avatamsaka.

Stagnation
After the time of Zongmi and Li Tongxuan the Chinese school of Huayan generally stagnated in terms of new development, and then eventually began to decline. The school, which had been dependent upon the support it received from the government, suffered severely during the Buddhist purge of 841-845, initiated by Emperor Wuzong of Tang. The school stagnated even further in the confusion of the Five Dynasties and Ten Kingdoms (907-979) period after the fall of the Tang dynasty when some Huayan commentaries were lost.

Revival and Expansion 

After the Five Dynasties and Ten Kingdoms, the Huayan lineage experienced a revival in the following Song dynasty (960-1279), and the few Huayan commentaries which had been dispersed were returned in 1085 by the Goryeo monk Uicheon. 

From the Song dynasty through the Yuan dynasty, Ming dynasty, and Qing dynasty to the modern period, Huayan philosophy continued to develop and new commentaries and rites were written and initiated, such as the "Rites on Practicing the Vows of Samantabhadra" (Chinese: 華嚴普賢行願修證儀; Pinyin: Huáyán Pǔxián Xíngyuàn Xiūzhèng Yí) and "Sagara-mudra Repentance Rites on the Flower Adornment Sutra" (Chinese: 華嚴經海印道場懺儀; Pinyin: Huáyánjīng Hǎiyìn Dàochǎng Chànyí). 

Throughout this period, much of Huayan's profound metaphysics, such as that of the Four Dharmadhātu (Pinyin: Sìfǎjiè) of interpenetration, was also integrated into the other Chinese Buddhist traditions.

Korean Hwaeom 

In the 7th century, the Huayan school was transmitted into Silla Korea, where it is known as Hwaeom (Hangul: 화엄). This tradition was transmitted by the monk Uisang (hangul:의상대사 625-702), who had been, along with Fazang, a student of Zhiyan. After Uisang returned to Korea in 671, he worked vigorously toward the establishment of the Hwaeom school. In this effort, he was greatly aided by the powerful influences of his friend Wonhyo (hangul:원효대사, hanja:元曉), who although not an official representative of the school, relied deeply on Hwaeom metaphysical principles to establish his concept of interpenetrated Buddhism (通佛教).

After the passing of these two early monks, the Hwaeom school became strongly established under the influence of a long series of Hwaeom masters. The Hwaeom school remained in the position of predominant doctrinal school up until the end of the Goryeo Dynasty, when it was placed into a forced merger with the Seon (Korean Zen) school. Within the Seon school, Hwaeom thought would continue to play a strong role, and continues as such to modern times.

Japanese Kegon 

Kegon is the Japanese transmission of Huayan. Huayan studies were founded in Japan in 736 when the scholar-priest Rōben (良辯 or 良弁), originally a monk of the East Asian Yogācāra tradition, invited Shinshō to give lectures on the Avatamsaka Sutra at Kinshōsen Temple (金鐘山寺, also 金鐘寺 Konshu-ji or Kinshō-ji), the origin of later Tōdai-ji. When the construction of the Tōdai-ji was completed, Rōben entered that temple to formally initiate Kegon as a field of study in Buddhism in Japan, and Kegon-shū would become known as one of the Nanto Rikushū (南都六宗) or "Six Buddhist Sects of Nanto". Rōben's disciple Jitchū continued administration of Tōdai-ji and expanded its prestige through the introduction of imported rituals.

Kegon thought would later be popularized by Myōe (明惠), who combined its doctrines with those of Vajrayana and Gyōnen (凝然), and is most responsible for the establishment of the Tōdai-ji lineage of Kegon. Over time, Kegon incorporated esoteric ritual from Shingon Buddhism, with which it shared a cordial relationship. Its practice continues to this day, and includes a few temples overseas.

Modern Era 

In 1914, Huayan University, the first modern Buddhist monastic school, was founded in Shanghai to further systematize Huayan teaching and teach monastics. It helped to expand the Huayan tradition into the rest of into East Asia, Taiwan, and the West. The university managed to foster a network of educated monks who focused on Huayan Buddhism during the 20th century. Through this network, the lineage of the Huayan tradition was transmitted to many monks, which helped to preserve the lineage down to the modern day via new Huayan-centred organizations that these monks would later found.

Several new Huayan Buddhist organizations have been established since the latter half of the 20th century. In contemporary times, the largest and oldest of the Huayan-centered organizations in Taiwan is the Huayan Lotus Society (Huayan Lianshe 華嚴蓮社), which was founded in 1952 by the monk Zhiguang and his disciple Nanting, who were both part of the network fostered by the Huayan University. Since its founding, the Huayan Lotus Society has been centered on the study and practice of the Huayan Sutra. It hosts a full recitation of the sutra twice each year, during the third and tenth months of the lunar calendar. Each year during the eleventh lunar month, the society also hosts a seven-day Huayan Buddha retreat (Huayan foqi 華嚴佛七), during which participants chant the names of the buddhas and bodhisattvas in the text. The society emphasizes the study of the Huayan Sutra by hosting regular lectures on it. In recent decades, these lectures have occurred on a weekly basis. 

Like other Taiwanese Buddhist organization's, the Society has also diversified its propagation and educational activities over the years. It produces its own periodical and runs its own press. It also now runs a variety of educational programs, including a kindergarten, a vocational college, and short-term courses in Buddhism for college and primary-school students, and offers scholarships. One example is their founding of the Huayan Buddhist College (Huayan Zhuanzong Xueyuan 華嚴專宗學院) in 1975. They have also established branch temples overseas, most notably in California’s San Francisco Bay Area. In 1989, they expanded their outreach to the United States of America by formally establishing the Huayan Lotus Society of the United States (Meiguo Huayan Lianshe 美國華嚴蓮社). Like the parent organization in Taiwan, this branch holds weekly lectures on the Huayan Sutra and several annual Huayan Dharma Assemblies where it is chanted. It also holds monthly memorial services for the society’s spiritual forebears.

In Mainland China, Huayan teachings began to be more widely re-propagated after the end of the Cultural Revolution. Various monks from the network of monks fostered by the original Huayan University, such as Zhenchan (真禪) and Mengcan (夢參), were the driving factors behind the re-propagation as they travelled widely throughout China as well as other countries such as the United States and lectured on Huayan teachings. In 1996, one of Mengcan's tonsured disciples, the monk Jimeng (繼夢), also known as Haiyun (海雲), founded the Huayan Studies Association (Huayan Xuehui 華嚴學會) in Taipei, which was followed in 1999 by the founding of the larger Caotangshan Great Huayan Temple (Caotangshan Da Huayansi 草堂山大華嚴寺). This temple hosts many Huayan-related 
activities, including a weekly Huayan Assembly. Since 2000, the 
association has grown internationally, with branches in Australia, Canada, and the United States.

Influence 
The doctrines of the Huayan school ended up having profound impact on the philosophical attitudes of East Asian Buddhism. According to Wei Daoru their theory of perfect interfusion was "gradually accepted by all Buddhist traditions and it eventually permeated all aspects of Chinese Buddhism."

Chinese Chán was profoundly influenced by it, though Chán also defined itself by distinguishing itself from Huayan. Guifeng Zongmi, the Fifth Patriarch of the Huayan school, also occupies a prominent position in the history of Chán. During the Song, the Huayan metaphysics were completely assimilated by the Chán-school.

Texts

Avataṃsaka Sūtra
The Huayan school's worldview was inspired on the content of what it considered to be the supreme Buddhist revelation, the Avataṃsaka Sūtra (Flower Garland Sutra, Ch. Huāyán Jīng). The Avataṃsaka Sūtra is a compilation of sutras of various length, which originally circulated as their own sutras before being combined. The earliest of these texts, the Ten Stages Sutra, maybe dates from the first century CE. The Daśabhūmika Sūtra describes the ten stages on the Bodhisattva-path. The various sutras were probably joined together shortly before its translation into Chinese, at the beginning of the 5th century CE.

According to Williams, the Avataṃsaka Sūtra is not a systematic philosophical work, but mentions various Mahayana teachings, including Madhyamaka śūnyatā teachings, Yogacara ideas, as well as mentioning a pure untainted awareness or consciousness (amalacitta). It is filled with mystical and visionary imagery, focusing on the Buddha Vairocana, who is said to pervade every atom of the entire universe with his magical creations and emanations as a way to help all beings:
An important doctrine that the Huayan school drew from this sutra is the idea that all levels of reality are interrelated and interpenetrated, the idea that "inside everything is everything else". The sutra states:They . . . perceive that the fields full of assemblies, the beings and aeons which are as many as all the dust particles, are all present in every particle of dust. They perceive that the many fields and assemblies and the beings and the aeons are all reflected in each particle of dust.In the Huayan school, this is depicted in the image of Indra's net. This "unity in totality allows every individual entity of the phenomenal world its uniqueness without attributing an inherent nature to anything". According to Williams,As a description of the way things are in our unenlightened world this seems incredible. But the dharmadhatu is the world as seen by the Buddha wherein there is no question of the world (an objectively real world ‘out there’) as distinct from meditative vision. Thus the sutra is less concerned with describing the world this way as with recounting the Bodhisattva’s attainments by which he can see the world in such a light, and the Bodhisattva’s miraculous powers by which, through his magical interventions in this world with no fixed hard boundaries, he can cause things to interpenetrate.

Other texts
Other Mahayana texts such as the Awakening of Faith in the Mahayana (Dasheng Qixin Lun 大乘起信論),  which was a condensation of Chinese thought on awakening and ultimate reality, influenced Huayan masters like Fazang and Zongmi, who both wrote commentaries on the text. The Lotus sutra was also seen as an important text in this school, though not as important as the Avatamsaka. The Sutra of Perfect Enlightenment was particularly important for Zongmi.

The Huayen patriarchs wrote numerous commentaries and original treatises on the Mahayana sutras and Huayen philosophy. Fazang for example, wrote commentaries on the Avatamsaka, the Lankavatara Sutra and the Awakening of Faith. One of the key Huayen treatises is On the Meditation of the Dharmadhātu attributed to the first patriarch Dushun. Another is Fazang’s Treatise on the Golden Lion which is said to have been written to explain Huayen's view of interpenetration to Empress Wu.

Peter N. Gregory notes that the Huayan commentarial tradition was:"not primarily concerned with a careful exegesis of the original meaning of the scripture. Rather, what it discovered in the text was the justification for a number of ideas and metaphors in terms of which it elaborated its own body of doctrine. Many of the key Huayan doctrines that were inspired by the scripture (such as nature origination, the conditioned origination of the dharmadhatu, the samadhi of oceanic reflection, or the six aspects of all dharmas) played only a peripheral role in or had a tenuous connection with the actual Huayan sutra itself. The great commentaries written on the text by Fa-tsang and Ch'eng-kuan were not so much concerned with rendering a faithful and judicious interpretation of the words of the text as they were with using the text as a basis from which to advance a doctrinal agenda that was determined by the context of Sui-Tang Buddhism."

Theory and practice

Huayan thought is mainly focused on explaining the nature of the Dharmadhatu, the world as it is ultimately, from the point of view of a fully awakened being. It is often said to be the philosophical articulation of Chan meditation. It is influenced by the Avatamsaka and Buddha nature literature as well as by the Chinese Yogacara and Madhyamaka schools. Patriarchs of the school such as Zongmi were also influenced by Chinese philosophy, particularly the classics of Taoism.

Interpenetration

 
A key doctrine of Huayan is the mutual containment and interpenetration of all phenomena (dharmas) or "perfect interfusion" (yuanrong, 圓融). This is associated with what the Huayan sees as its unique contribution, the "dharmadhatu pratityasamutpada". This is described by Wei Daoru as the idea that "countless dharmas (all phenomena in the world) are representations of the wisdom of Buddha without exception" and that "they exist in a state of mutual dependence, interfusion and balance without any contradiction or conflict. This thought essentially argues that there is no relationship of cause and result among phenomena and that things are not formed sequentially. Instead, they constitute the world by the mutual interfusion of complete equality."

According to this theory, any phenomenon exists only as part of the total nexus of reality, its existence depends on the total network of all other things, which are all equally connected to each other and contained in each other. 
 
The Huayan patriarchs used various metaphors to express this, such as Indra's net, a hall of mirrors and the world text. To illustrate the doctrine to Empress Wu, the patriarch Fazang:

"called for a candle and placed it surrounded by mirrors on every side. When lit, the candle was reflected in each mirror, and each of the reflections in every other mirror so that in any one mirror were the images of all the others." 

This Buddhist doctrine also includes the views that:
"Practicing one teaching is practicing all teachings" 
Ending one mental defilement is ending all of them
 Truth (or reality) is understood as encompassing and interpenetrating falsehood (or illusion), and vice versa
 Good is understood as encompassing and interpenetrating evil
 Similarly, all mind-made distinctions are understood as "collapsing" in the enlightened understanding of emptiness (a tradition traced back to the Buddhist philosopher Nagarjuna)

Li and Shi
Another important distinction used by Huayan patriarchs is that of li and shi, noumenon and phenomenon which was explained using the metaphor of gold and lions, or water and waves. According to Paul Williams:

First, noumenon and phenomena mutually interpenetrate and are (in a sense) identical. There is no opposition between the two. The one does not cancel out the other. Second, Fazang explains elsewhere that since all things arise interdependently (following Madhyamika), and since the links of interdependence expand throughout the entire universe and at all time (past, present, and future depend upon each other, which is to say the total dharmadhatu arises simultaneously), so in the totality of interdependence, the dharmadhatu, all phenomena are mutually interpenetrating and identical.

Fourfold Dharmadhatu and meditation
The theory of the Fourfold Dharmadhatu (sifajie, 四法界) is explained in the "Meditative Perspectives on the Huayan Dharmadhatu" (Huayan Fajie Guanmen, 華嚴法界觀門) and its commentaries. This theory is the central meditative framework for the Huayan tradition. Another key text is the  "Cessation and Contemplation in the Five Teachings of Huayan" (Huayan wujiao zhiguan 華嚴五教止觀). The Dharmadhatu is the goal of the bodhisattva's practice, the ultimate nature of reality which must be known or entered into (ru, 入). According to Fox, the Fourfold Dharmadhatu is "four cognitive approaches to the world, four ways of apprehending reality". The four ways of seeing reality are: 

 All dharmas are seen as particular separate events or phenomena (shi 事). This is the mundane way of seeing.
 All events are an expression of li (理, the absolute, principle or noumenon), which is associated with the concepts of shunyata,  “One Mind” (yi xin 一心) and Buddha nature
 Shi and Li interpenetrate (lishi wuai 理事無礙)
 All events interpenetrate (shishi wuai 事事無礙), "all distinct phenomenal dharmas interfuse and penetrate in all ways" (Zongmi).

The three levels of Huayan meditation on the Dharmadhatu correspond to the last three views of the Dharmadhatu are:

Meditation on “True Emptiness.”
Illuminating the non-obstruction of principle and phenomena.
Meditation on “universal pervasion and complete accommodation.”

According to Fox, "these dharmadhatus are not separate worlds – they are actually increasingly more holographic perspectives on a single phenomenological manifold...they more properly represent four types or orders of perspectives on experience." Furthermore, for Huayan, this practice is the solution to the problem of samsara which lies in the "fixation or attachment to a particular perspective. What we think are the essences of objects are really therefore nothing but mere names, mere functional designations, and none of these contextual definitions need necessarily interfere with any of the others."

Other practices
According to Paul Williams, the reading and recitation of the Avatamsaka sutra was also a central practice for the tradition, for monks and laity.

Another practice which is highlighted in the Avatamsaka sutra is that of Buddhānusmṛti or nianfo-mindfulness of the Buddha.

The tradition also mentions two key samadhis, the ocean-seal samadhi (Ch. haiyin sanmei) and the huayan samadhi (huayan sanmei).

Layman Li Tongxuan developed a unique meditative practice based on the 9th chapter of the Avatamsaka sutra. The practice, named 'the contemplation of Buddhalight' (foguang guan), focused on tracing the universal light which is radiated by the Buddha in one's mind and expanding it further outwards.

Sudden enlightenment
Huayan favored the teaching of sudden enlightenment. This is because the Buddha nature is already present in all sentient beings and also because their theory of interpenetration entails that Buddhahood is already present at the first stage of a Bodhisattva's path. According to Li Tongxuan:

[T]he first access of faith in the mind of the practitioner is in itself the culmination of the entire path, the very realization of final Buddhahood.... ‘Faith’ or confidence in the possibility of enlightenment is nothing but enlightenment itself, in an anticipatory and causative modality.

Buddhahood was seen as beyond language and stages of practice. Because practices cannot create something that is already not imminent, they were seen as simply revealing what was already there. The patriarch Zongmi formulated his own theory of awakening which was "immediate awakening followed by gradual cultivation" and the view that "immediate and gradual are not only not contradictory, but are actually complementary".

Paradox
Huayan makes extensive use of paradox in argument and literary imagery. All three types of paradox originate in the tension between conventional and absolute truth. Huayan uses three types of paradox:
1. Emphasizing the concept of śūnyatā, first is asserted that a phenomenon X is empty, which implies that X is not X. An example from Fazang is the assertion:
2. Reversing the first paradox by asserting that any empty phenomenon is an expression of the absolute non-duality between emptiness and form, or the identity between conditioned, relative reality and the ultimate truth of tathatā. 
This paradox is derived from two doctrinal sources: 
 The Huayan concept of "true emptiness." 
 The Huayan interpretation of the dialectic of the One Mind in the Awakening of Faith in the Mahayana.
Fazang's paradoxical assertion illustrates this second type:

3. The third variation of paradox is grounded in the Huayan doctrine of the "nonobstruction of all phenomena" (shih shih wu-ai(k)). Each phenomenon is perceived as interpenetrating with and containing all others. This paradoxical violation of the conventional order of time and space is exemplified by Fa-tsang's famous "Essay on the Golden Lion":

Classification of Buddhist teachings
Buddhism was introduced into China in bits and pieces. When the knowledge of Buddhism grew larger, various schools attempted to get a grip on the Buddhist tradition by developing classifications of teachings, such as the Five Periods and Eight Teachings of the Tiantai-school.

The Huayan school developed a fivefold classification:
 The Hinayana-teachings, especially the Sarvastivadins
 The Mahayana-teachings, including Yogacara, Madhyamaka
 The "Final Teachings", based on the Tathagatagarbha-teachings, especially the Awakening of Faith
 The Sudden Teaching, "which 'revealed' (hsien) rather than verbalised the teaching"
 The Complete, or Perfect, Teachings of the Avatamsaka-sutra and the Huayan school.

Huayan and Chan had doctrinal arguments regarding which would be the correct concept of sudden awakening. The teachings of the Chán-school were regarded as inferior by the Huayan teachers. The Chán-school polemitized against this classification, by devising its own rhetorics in defense.

References

Sources

 {{Citation | last =Buswell | first =Robert E. | year =1991 | title =The "Short-cut" Approach of K'an-hua Meditation: The Evolution of a Practical Subitism in Chinese Ch'an Buddhism. In: Peter N. Gregory (editor)(1991), Sudden and Gradual. Approaches to Enlightenment in Chinese Thought | place =Delhi | publisher =Motilal Banarsidass Publishers Private Limited}}
 Cleary, Thomas, trans. (1993). The Flower Ornament Scripture: A Translation of the Avatamsaka Sūtra. 
 
 
 
 
 
 

Further reading
 Cleary, Thomas (1995). Entry Into the Inconceivable: An Introduction to Hua-Yen Buddhism, University of Hawaii Press; Reprint edition.   (Essays by Tang Dynasty Huayen masters)
 Fa Zang (2014). "Rafter Dialogue" and "Essay on the Golden Lion," in Justin Tiwald and Bryan W. Van Norden, eds., Readings in Later Chinese Philosophy.'' Indianapolis:  Hackett Publishing. 
 Gimello, Robert; Girard, Frédéric; Hamar, Imre (2012). Avataṃsaka Buddhism in East Asia: Huayan, Kegon, Flower Ornament Buddhism ; origins and adaptation of a visual culture, Asiatische Forschungen:  Monographienreihe zur Geschichte, Kultur und Sprache der Völker Ost- u. Zentralasiens, Wiesbaden: Harrassowitz, .
 Gregory, Peter N. (1983). The place of the Sudden Teaching within the Hua-Yen tradition：an investigation of the process of doctrinal change, Journal of the International Association of Buddhist Studies 6 (1), 31 - 60
 Haiyun Jimeng  (2006). The Dawn of Enlightenment - The Opening Passage of Avatamsaka Sutra with a Commentary, Kongting Publishing. 
 Hamar, Imre, ed. (2007), Reflecting Mirrors: Perspectives on Huayan Buddhism. Wiesbaden: Harrassowitz Verlag
 Prince, Tony (2020), Universal Enlightenment - An introduction to the Teachings and Practices of Huayen Buddhism (2nd edn.). Amazon Kindle Book.

External links
 Buddhism in a nutshell - Hua-yen
 Chang Chung-Yuan, The World of Shih & Li of Tung-Shan
 Flower Adornment Sutra - Hua Yan Jing - Avatamsaka Original Text
 Articles by Imre Hamar

 
Buddhist philosophical concepts
Buddhism in China